

References 

Lists of medical abbreviations